Akarahaduwa is a village in Sri Lanka within Matale District, Central Province. It is bounded on the west, north, and east by the Amban River, a tributary of the Mahaweli River.

History
According to Archibald Campbell Lawrie's 1896 gazetteer of the province, the inhabitants of the village smelted and delivered iron. A considerable number of the villagers were Moors who supported their lebbe and their mosque.

Demographics

See also
List of towns in Central Province, Sri Lanka

External links

References

Populated places in Matale District